Charles Anthony Voight (April 28, 1887 – February 10, 1947) was an American cartoonist, best known for his comic strip Betty.

Early life
Born in Brooklyn, New York, Voight was 14 when he dropped out of school and became an art staffer at the New York World. During this period, he also did advertising art.

Comic strips
In 1908, he drew his first comic strip, Petey Dink, for the Boston Traveler. When it moved to the New York Herald it became simply Petey (sometimes titled Poor Little Petey). He also drew for the New York World, and for Life, he created a series titled The Optimist. 

His popular glamor girl Sunday strip Betty began in 1919 with the McClure Syndicate, moving to the New York Herald Syndicate with the April 4, 1920, edition. Comics historian Don Markstein described the strip and characters:

Betty was an influential strip, notably on the illustrator and comic book artist Bernard Krigstein. Jerry Robinson, in his book The Comics: An Illustrated History of the Comic Strip, commented:

The classic beauty was seen in Betty. Charles Voight employed an exquisite pen style in defining the visual delights of the long-legged, cool sophisticate in the extreme fashion of the day, including beachwear that revealed areas not previously shown in the comic pages.

Voight continued to do artwork for advertising agencies, such as his 1932 Rinso Soap ads.

Comic books
After Betty ended its run in 1943, Voight began drawing for comic books, including He-Man in Tally-Ho Comics (1944) and work for Prize Comics (1945). In 1946, he drew Impossible Man for Captain Wizard and the superhero satire Captain Milksop for Atomic Bomb Comics #1.

Voight lived for a time in Pelham, New York. When Fontaine Fox first came to visit his friend Voight, he rode the Pelham trolley that inspired him to create the Toonerville Trolley for his long-running cartoon panel, Toonerville Folks.

References

External links
Animation Archive
Charles Voight's "He-Man"
Charles Voight's "Impossible Man"

1887 births
1947 deaths
American comic strip cartoonists
Artists from Brooklyn
People from Pelham, New York